, is a Japanese manga series written by Sōji Yamakawa and illustrated by Noboru Kawasaki. It was published in Weekly Shōnen Jump from 1971 to 1974.

It was adapted into an anime by Tokyo Movie Shinsha, Shingo Araki and Daikichiro Kusube created the character designs, while Hayao Miyazaki was in the team of animators. The series consists of 52 episodes and was originally broadcast on Fuji TV.

Cast
 Akira Kamiya as Isamu
 Ichirô Murakoshi as Ned Wingate
 Iemasa Kayumi as Rhett Wingate
 Kiyoshi Kobayashi as Big Stone
 Osamu Kato as Old Wingate
 Takeshi Kuwabara as Narrator

References

External links
 Official TMS site for the anime adaptation under the official English title The Rough and Ready Cowboy
 

1973 anime television series debuts
1974 Japanese television series endings
Action anime and manga
Adventure anime and manga
TMS Entertainment
Shueisha franchises
Shueisha manga
TBS Television (Japan) original programming
Western (genre) anime and manga